Logonym is a polysemic term, and a neologism (coined from  / word, and  / name). The term has several meanings, spanning across different fields of study. It was primarily defined as a term that designates various types of titles, including titles of literary and other artistic works, and also came to designate titles of business firms and their products, including their acronyms.  The term also has a specific meaning in biological classification, and some authors have used the term as an alternative designation for the proper names of languages, but such use could not replace previously established onomastic terms (linguonyms, glossonyms, glottonyms), that are commonly used as designations for the onomastic class of language names.

See also
 Linguonym
 -onym

References

Sources

 
 
 
 
 
 
 
 
 
 

Onomastics
Definitions